Samin Baghtcheban (variations: Baghcheban, Baqcheban, Bahceban) (1923 – 19 March 2008) was an Iranian composer, author and translator.

Biography
Samin Baghtcheban was born in 1925 in Tabriz, Persia (modern Iran) and grew up in Shiraz and Tehran, where his father established the first modern kindergartens and schools for the deaf in Iran. His father, Jabbar Baghtcheban, was a leading educator and pioneer of Persian cued speech.

Samin Baghcheban started his music studies at the Tehran Conservatory of Music. In 1944 Samin Baghtcheban was awarded a scholarship to study composition in Ankara State Conservatory. He returned to Tehran in 1949 and started teaching at the Conservatory.

He was married to the opera singer, Evelyn Baghtcheban, whom he met while studying in Ankara.

In 1984 he moved to Turkey with his family where he continued his activities and composed several new pieces, some of which were performed by Manouchehr Sahbai in Switzerland.

He died on 19 March 2008 in Istanbul.

Compositions
Throughout his career he composed numerous pieces inspired by the Persian folk music or mythology. His most popular work is Rangin Kamoon (Rainbow), a collection of compositions for children (for choire and orchestra) which was recorded in 1978 in Vienna.
Other Works:
 Persian Compositions for Voice and Piano (including 4 pieces: 1- Ruba'i No. 1: Do Zolfoonet (Your two braids) (1950) Text: Baba-Taher (11th-century Persian poet). 2- To Ra Mikham (I want you) (1952) Text: Folklore. 3- Sorood-e Saba (Saba's song) (1956) Text: Sa'di (13th-century poet). 4- Gahvareh-ye Khali (Empty cradle) (1957) Text: the composer), published in 2018, on the 10th death anniversary of the composer.
 Sholeyl (for string orchestra)
 Boumivar (in 3 movements) for orchestra.
 Chaharshanbeh-Souri

Baghcheban also arranged various Persian folk songs for the choir. Some of his arrangements were performed by Tehran Choral Group and the Farah Choir in the 1960s and 1970s.

Literary works
Between 1948 and 1979, in addition to his composition activities, he wrote and translated several books and articles. Baghtcheban translated several books by Turkish authors Nazim Hikmet, Yaşar Kemal and introduced the humorist Aziz Nesin to Iranians.

In 1963, along with a group of prominent teachers and educators, including Lily Ahi, Touran Mirhadi and Abbas Yamini Sharif, Baghtcheban confounded the Children's Book Council (CBC) of Iran. The council is an NGO focused on developing and promoting children's literature in Iran.

References

External links
 My brother Samin (برادرم ثمین), a multimedia presentation on Baghtchehban's life, Jadid online
 Samin Baghtcheban dead ثمین باغچه بان درگذشت, BBC Persian
 Rangin Kamoon was our childhood...In memory of Samin Baghtcheban رنگین کمان کودکی ما بود...؛ به یاد ثمین باغچه بان, Obituary in BBC Persian
 Book review of Baghtcheban's Snapshots from My Father نقدي بر کتاب چهره هايي از پدرم
 Norouz is coming... نوروز تو راهه..., Article on Rangin Kamoon album
 Rangin Kamoon (رنگین کمان), A small tribute to Rangin Kamoon Album

Azerbaijani-language writers
1925 births
2008 deaths
Iranian composers
Iranian translators
People from Tabriz
Iranian emigrants to Turkey
Turkish people of Iranian descent
Ankara State Conservatory alumni
20th-century translators